The 1994 Auburn Tigers football team represented Auburn University in the 1994 NCAA Division I-A football season.  Led by second-year head coach Terry Bowden, they continued the success of the previous season by going 9–1–1.  Some of Auburn's wins came in dramatic fashion.  The Tigers made five interceptions in the 4th quarter against LSU and completed a last-second pass to beat Florida in Gainesville.  Auburn won their first nine games of the season to extend a winning streak extending from 1993 to 20 games before ending the year with a tie against Georgia and a loss to Alabama.  Auburn returned to television this season, but was still serving a postseason ban that made them ineligible for a bowl game.

Schedule

Roster

Rankings

Season summary

at Ole Miss

Stephen Davis 33 Rush, 158 Yds

at Florida

Georgia

vs. Alabama

References

Auburn
Auburn Tigers football seasons
Auburn Tigers football